Pustunich is a town located in the Ticul Municipality, Yucatán in Mexico.  It is located 86 km from the state capital, Mérida, and 3 km southeast from Ticul.

References

Populated places in Yucatán